Pyrinioides is a genus of moths of the family Thyrididae.

Species
Pyrinioides aurea Butler, 1881
Pyrinioides flaveolus (Matsumura, 1921)
Pyrinioides sinuosus (Warren, 1896)

References

 Butler 1881: Trans. ent. Soc. London, 1881, 199.

Thyrididae
Moth genera